Elizabeth Butchill  (ca. 1758–1780) was an English woman who was tried and executed for the murder of her illegitimate newborn child.

Life
Little of Butchill's early life is known except that she came from Saffron Walden, Essex. In about 1777, Butchill—unmarried—moved to Cambridge to live with her uncle and aunt, William and Esther Hall. Like her aunt, she worked as a college bed maker at Trinity College. On 6 January 1780 Butchill spent the day in bed groaning and complaining of colic. She was tended to by her aunt in the morning and later in the evening. On 7 January the body of a newborn girl was found in the river near the Halls' home on the grounds of the college. At an inquest, the coroner—Mr Bond—determined that the baby had died of a fractured skull. William Hall believed that the infant was Butchill's and arranged for a surgeon to examine her. On examination, she admitted that she had given birth to the baby. She said that the child was born alive and that she had thrown her down a "necessary" (toilet) into the river and buried the placenta.

Butchill was charged by the coroner's jury with wilful murder. Unusually for an unmarried woman, she was not charged as the mother, that is, under the Concealment of Birth of Bastards Act 1623. Under this act, it was a capital offence for a mother to conceal the birth of a child. Butchill was simply tried for murder, and convicted. Despite pleading for mercy, she was sentenced to death and her body was to be anatomized. She was executed on 17 March 1780 at Cambridge. According to The Newgate Calendar, on the day of her death, she was "firm, resigned, and exemplary ... reconciled to her fate".

References

1758 births
1780 deaths
British female murderers
English murderers of children
English people convicted of murder
English prisoners sentenced to death
Executed English women
Executed people from Essex
Filicides in England
People convicted of murder by England and Wales
People executed by England and Wales by hanging
People executed by the Kingdom of Great Britain
People executed for murder
People from Saffron Walden